Caddywhompus is an American band based in New Orleans. The band originally referred to themselves as a "noise pop" band, although they later stopped using that descriptor. The band members, Chris Rehm and Sean Hart, both grew up in Houston and have been friends since kindergarten.

Albums

 Odd Hours (2017)
 Feathering A Nest (2014)
 Remainder (2010)

EPs

 The Weight (2011)
 Caddywhompus (2008)

Compilations 
 EPs (2009)

References

Musical groups from New Orleans